The finals and the qualifying heats of the Women's 100 metres Freestyle event at the 1998 European Short Course Swimming Championships were held on the first day of the competition, on Friday 11 December 1998 in Sheffield, England.

Finals

Qualifying Heats

Remarks

References
 Results

F
E
1998 in women's swimming